Sendas is a civil parish in the municipality of Bragança, Portugal. The population in 2011 was 183, in an area of 19.17 km².

References

Parishes of Bragança, Portugal